The Humanitas Prize for 30 Minute Network or Syndicated Television is an award presented to the best written 30-minute network or syndicated television program. The winners are indicated in bold.

1975 (1st)
Good Times:
"The Lunch Money Rip-Off" — John Baskin & Roger Schulman
"My Girl Henrietta" — Bob Peete
Sunshine: "Angel of Doom" — M. Charles Cohen

1976 (2nd)
Doc — Seth Freeman
''M*A*S*H:"The Interview" — Larry Gelbart"Quo Vadis, Captain Chandler?" — Burt Prelutsky

1977 (3rd)
All in the Family: "Archie's Brief Encounter - Part II" — Larry Rhine & Mel Tolkin
M*A*S*H: "Dear Sigmund" — Alan AldaThe Mary Tyler Moore Show: "Ted's Change of Heart" — Earl Pomerantz1978 (4th)All in the Family: "The Brother" — Larry Rhine & Mel TolkinBarney Miller: "Goodbye, Mr. Fish - Part II" — Reinhold Weege
The Jeffersons: "984 W. 124th St., Apt. 5C" — John Baskin & Roger Shulman

1979 (5th)
All in the Family: "Edith Gets Fired" — Teleplay by Harriett Weiss & Patt Shea; Story by Mort Lachman
M*A*S*H: "Point of View" — Ken Levine and David IsaacsTaxi: "Blind Date" — Michael Leeson1980 (6th)M*A*S*H: "Dreams" — Teleplay by Alan Alda; Story by Alan Alda and James Jay RubinfierUnited States: "Uncle Charlie" — Gary Markowitz
WKRP in Cincinnati: "God Talks to Johnny" — Hugh Wilson

1981 (7th)
Archie Bunker's Place: "Tough Love" — Patt Shea and Harriett Weiss
M*A*S*H: "Blood Brothers" — Elias Davis & David PollockWKRP in Cincinnati: "Venus Flytrap Explains" — Hugh Wilson1982 (8th)
Archie Bunker's Place: "Relapse" — Patt Shea & Harriett WeissM*A*S*H: "Where There's a Will, There's a War" — Elias Davis & David PollockOne Day at a Time: "Mrs. O'Leary's Kid" — Paul Perlove

1983 (9th)
Diff'rent Strokes: "Bicycle Man II" — Blake Hunter
It Takes Two: "Death Penalty" — Susan HarrisM*A*S*H: "Who Knew?" — Elias Davis & David Pollock1984 (10th)Family Ties:"Not an Affair to Remember" — Gary David Goldberg & Ruth Bennett"Say Uncle" — Ruth Bennett
Gimme a Break!: "Herbie" — Arthur Julian

1985 (11th)The Cosby Show:"Theo and the Joint" — John MarkusFamily Ties:
"Hotline Fever" — Marc Lawrence
"Remembrance of Things Past - Part II" — Gary David Goldberg & Alan Uger

1986 (12th)The Cosby Show:"Denise's Friend" — John Markus"An Early Spring" — Matt Williams
"Truth or Consequences" — John Markus & Carmen Finestra & Gary Kott
Mr. Sunshine — David Lloyd

1987 (13th)
The Cosby Show: "The March" — Gary Kott
Family Ties: "My Back Pages" — Ruth BennettKate & Allie: "Jennie & Jason" — Bob Randall1988 (14th)Frank's Place: "The Bridge" — Hugh WilsonKate & Allie: "Brother, Can You Spare a Dime?" — Teleplay Bob Randall & William Persky; Story by Anne Flett-Giordano (as Anne Flett) & Chuck Ranberg
The Wonder Years: "Pilot" — Neal Marlens & Carol Black

1989 (15th)
Baby Boom: "Guilt" — Nancy Meyers & Charles ShyerThe Wonder Years: "Pottery Will Get You Nowhere" — Matthew Carlson1990 (16th)
Why, Charlie Brown, Why? — Charles M. SchulzThe Wonder Years:"The Powers That Be" — David M. Stern"Square Dance" — Todd W. Langen1991 (17th)
Doogie Howser, M.D.: "To Live and Die in Brentwood" — Nat Bernstein & Mitchel Lee KatlinThe Wonder Years:"Goodbye" — Bob Brush"The Ties That Bind" — Mark B. Perry

1992 (18th)Brooklyn Bridge: "Boys of Summer" — John MasiusCaptain Planet and the Planeteers: "The Ark" — Doug Molitor
A Different World: "Mammy Dearest" — Glenn Berenbeim
Roseanne: "This Old House" — Teleplay by Chuck Lorre & Jeff Abugov; Story by Michael Poryes
The Wonder Years: "Hardware Store" — Craig Hoffman

1993 (19th)Roseanne:"Terms of Estrangement - Part II" — Rob Ulin"Wait 'Til Your Father Gets Home" — Amy Sherman-Palladino (as Amy Sherman)
The Wonder Years: "Nose" — Sy Rosen

1994 (20th)
Edith Ann: A Few Pieces of the Puzzle — Jane Wagner
Frasier: "The Good Son" — David Angell & Peter Casey & David Lee
The John Larroquette Show: "Amends" — Don Reo & Judith D. AllisonMurphy Brown: "Reaper Madness" — Rob Bragin1995 (21st)
Blossom: "The Date" — Allan Katz
Grace Under Fire: "Grace Under Water" — Marc FlanaganThe John Larroquette Show: "Faith" — David RichardsonRoseanne: "White Men Can't Kiss" — Rob Ulin & Kevin Abbott

1996 (22nd)Frasier: "Breaking the Ice" — Steve LevitanGrace Under Fire: "No Help Wanted" — Stevie Ray Fromstein
Home Improvement: "The Longest Day" — Elliot Shoenman & Marley Sims

1997 (23rd)
Grace Under Fire: "Pills" — Stevie Ray Fromstein
Roseanne: "The Miracle" — Written by Drew Ogier; Story by Roseanne Barr (as Roseanne)Something So Right: "Something About An Older Guy" — Bob Tischler1998 (24th)
Foto-Novelas: "The Fix" — Bennett Cohen and Edit Villareal
Frasier: "The Kid" — Jeffrey Richman and Suzanne MartinMurphy Brown: "Turpis Capillis Annus (Bad Hair Year)" — Marilyn Suzanne Miller1999 (25th)
Everybody Loves Raymond: "Frank's Tribute" — Eric CohenSports Night:"The Quality of Mercy at 29K" — Bill Wrubel and Aaron Sorkin"The Six Southern Gentlemen of Tennessee" — Aaron Sorkin and Matt Tarses & David Walpert & Bill Wrubel2000 (26th)
3rd Rock from the Sun: "Dick, Who's Coming to Dinner" — David Goetsch & Jason VenokurFrasier: "Something About Dr. Mary" — Jay KogenSmart Guy: "Never Too Young" — Steven B. Young

2001 (27th)Everybody Loves Raymond: "Ray's Journal" — Jennifer CrittendenFrasier: "Frasier's Edge" — Jon Sherman & Dan O'Shannon
Malcolm in the Middle: Larry Strawther

2002 (28th)Scrubs: "My Old Lady" — Matt TarsesState of Grace:
"Looking for God in All the Right Places" — Steven Peterman & Gary Dontzig
"Love, Love, Me Do" — Brenda Lilly & Hollis Rich

2003 (29th)The Bernie Mac Show:"Sweet Home Chicago - Part I" — Teleplay by Warren Hutcherson and Kriss Turner; Story by Larry Wilmore"Sweet Home Chicago - Part II" — Teleplay by Teri Schaffer and Steve Tompkins; Story by Larry WilmoreFrasier: "Rooms With A View" — Dan O'Shannon & Lori Kirkland & Bob Daily

2004 (30th)The Bernie Mac Show:"Eye of the Tiger" — Richard Appel
"Saving Sergeant Tompkins" — Jacqueline R. Clay
Scrubs: "My Screwup" — Garrett Donovan & Neil Goldman

2006 (32nd)
George Lopez: "The Kidney Stays in the Picture" — Jim HopeMy Name Is Earl: Pilot — Gregory Thomas Garcia (as Greg Garcia)Scrubs: "My Way Home" — Garrett Donovan & Neil Goldman

2007 (33rd)The New Adventures of Old Christine: "Oh God, Yes" — Jennifer CrittendenScrubs: "My Fallen Idol" — Bill Callahan
The War at Home: "Kenny Doesn't Live Here Anymore" — Rob Lotterstein

2008 (34th)
The Bill Engvall Show: "Aloha, Raffles" — Kathy Ann Stumpe
In Treatment: "Sophie - Week Two" — Sarah TreemScrubs: "My Long Goodbye" — Dave Tennant2009 (35th)
30 Rock: "Believe in the Stars" — Robert Carlock
How I Met Your Mother: "Happily Ever After" — Jamie RhonheimerScrubs: "My Last Words" — Aseem BatraThe Simpsons: "All About Lisa" — John Frink

2010 (36th)
Meet the Browns: "Meet the Racist" — Myra J. Hughes (as Myra J)
The Middle: "The Block Party" — Alex ReidModern Family: Pilot — Steve Levitan & Christopher LloydNurse Jackie: Pilot — Liz Brixius & Linda Wallem and Evan DunskyThe Simpsons: "The Greatest Story Ever D'ohed" — Kevin Curran

2011 (37th)
The Big C: "Taking the Plunge" — Darlene Hunt
How I Met Your Mother: "Last Words" — Carter Bays & Craig ThomasModern Family: "The Kiss" — Abraham HigginbothamNurse Jackie: "Monkey Bits" — Liz Brixius

2012 (38th)
The Big C: "A Little Death" — Jenny Bicks
The Middle: "The Map" — DeAnn Heline & Eileen HeislerModern Family'': "Aunt Mommy" — Abraham Higginbotham & Dan O'Shannon

American television awards